Hosley is a surname. Notable people with the surname include:

Jayron Hosley (born 1990), American football player
Quinton Hosley (born 1984), American-born Georgian basketball player
Tim Hosley (1947–2014), American baseball player

See also
Holley (surname)
Holsey